The Contestado War, broadly speaking, was a guerrilla war for land between settlers and landowners, the latter supported by the Brazilian state's police and military forces, that lasted from October 1912 to August 1916.

It was fought in an inland southern region of the country, rich in wood and yerba mate, that was called Contestado because it was contested by the states of Paraná and Santa Catarina as well as Argentina. The war had its casus belli in the social conflicts in the region, the result of local disobediences, particularly regarding the regularization of land ownership on the part of the caboclos. The conflict was permeated by religious fanaticism expressed by the messianism and faith of the rebellious caboclos that they were engaged in a religious war; at the same time, it reflected the dissatisfaction of the population with its material situation.

Background

Societal prominence of monks
The origins of the Contestado War can be understood best by beginning a little earlier and considering the influence of three monks of the region. The first one who rose to prominence was João Maria, a man of Italian origin, who wandered, preaching and attending to the sick, from 1844 to 1870. He lived a very simple life, and his ethics and lifestyle attracted thousands of followers. Although many sources say he died in 1870, he actually left Brazil in 1852; after traveling in Mexico, Cuba, and Canada, he was killed in April, 1869; in Mesilla, New Mexico, USA.

The second monk also adopted the alias of João Maria, although his real name was Atanás Marcaf, probably of Syrian origin. He appeared to the public during the Federalist Revolution of 1893; where he belonged to the Maragato faction, and projected a firm and even messianic stature. He even made prophecies about the political events of his time. He was active in the region between the Iguaçu and Uruguay rivers. As a sign of his unquestioned influence over the faithful, a portion of them waited for his return by resurrection after his disappearance in 1908.

The wait of the faithful ended in 1912, when the figure of the third monk appeared in public. He was initially known as an herbal healer, having presented himself under the name of José Maria de Santo Agostinho. However, according to a report of the police of Vila de Palmas, Paraná state, he was, in reality, an army deserter who had been convicted of rape, by the name of Miguel Lucena de Boaventura.

Because no one knew his origins, and because he lived a straight and honest life, it was not difficult for him to achieve the people's admiration and confidence in a short period of time. One of his claims to fame was the account of his resurrection of a young lady (who probably was just a victim of catalepsy). He was also said to have cured the colonel Francisco de Almeida's wife of a previously uncurable illness. After this event the monk won even more fame and trust by declining the land and significant quantity of gold that the grateful colonel offered him.

From this point on, José Maria began to be considered a saint: a man who had come to Earth only to heal the sick and aid the needy. Methodical and organized, he was quite different from the familiar healers. He knew how to read and write and he described in his notebooks the medical properties of the plants found in the region. With the permission of Colonel Almeida, he set up what was known as the "people's pharmacy" at the ranch of one of the foremen, where he stored up medicinal herbs that he used in his daily medical consultations with anyone who wished to visit him, until the late hours of the night.

Railroad

A foreign company was commissioned to finish the railroad that was to have been begun in 1890 by the engineer João Teixeira Soares. This railroad would connect the cities of São Paulo to Santa Maria, in Rio Grande do Sul state. As Teixeira did not, or could not, take on the project, the responsibility was transferred in 1908 to the Brazil Railway Company, a north-American company owned by Percival Farquhar.

Besides the right to finish the project, the company also obtained from the government the right to explore a strip of land 15 km (9.32 mi) wide on each side of the railroad. The Company thus legally seized ownership of the land that it bordered and offered work to local families during the construction of the railroad.

At the same time, the concession guaranteed that another associated company of the trust, the Southern Brazil Lumber & Colonization would have the rights to extract lumber and later resell the land.

It was estimated that 8000 men had worked for the railroad at the time; workers coming from the urban populations of Rio de Janeiro, Santos, Salvador and Recife attracted by the possibility of high wages and other advantages.

However, by the time the construction work was finished a large number of people were left without work or a place to go (as much land around the railroad was legally owned by the Trust) adding to unrest amid dissatisfaction.

The first casualties

The Brazilian government, then led by Marshal Hermes da Fonseca who was responsible for the policy of military interventions in other states in order to eliminate political adversaries, decided to send federal troops to that region in order to quell the rebellion.

Foreseeing what was coming, José Maria (Miguel Lucena Boaventura) left immediately for the border town of Irani with his followers. Irani at the time belonged to the municipality of Palmas which was within the jurisdiction of the state of Paraná. As Paraná and Santa Catarina then had unresolved land disputes, the government of Paraná regarded this mass relocation of people as a strategy by the State of Santa Catarina to occupy and claim those lands. So the Contestado war began there in October 1912. In order to prevent the sudden mass occupation of that land, some troops of the Regiment of Security of Paraná State were sent out to force the invaders to return to Santa Catarina.

But things did not go as planned. A bloody confrontation started between government troops and followers of the Contestado at a place called Banhado Grande. At the end of the battle, dozens of people from both sides were dead, and the rebels seized a large number of guns and amounts of ammunition from the Paraná police forces. Among those killed were Colonel Gualberto João, who commanded the troops, and also the Monk Jose Maria, but the partisans of the Contestado had obtained their first victory.

Jose Maria was buried by his followers, who hoped for his resurrection (in similar fashion to the legend of the king Sebastian of Portugal, who was revered by some messianic followers of Sebastianism).

The federal government sent in 200 federal troops on December 29, 1913 in order to deal with the rebellion. Once again, the government was upset by the fierce opposition. For some historians, this is considered to be the official beginning of the war, despite the initial confrontations back in 1912.

More conflicts, attacks and counter-attacks
On February 8, 1914, the federal and state governments sent 700 men to Taquaruçu, supported by artillery and machine guns. Caraguatá was a more remote location where 2,000 other people had already settled. The followers in Caraguatá were led by Maria Rosa, a 15-year-old girl who led the 6000-strong armed rebellion after the death of José Maria.

In March and May of that year other expeditions were sent out, however they were all unsuccessful. As the social order degraded quickly in the region, the central government appointed General Carlos Frederico de Mesquita (a veteran of the Canudos rebellion) to lead a new operation against the rebels. He led an assault on the village of Santo Antônio da Platina, causing the rebels to flee. The hamlet of Caraguatá where the federal troops were first chased from by the rebels was now struck by typhoid fever. General Mesquita mistakenly believed the rebels were finally dispersed and declared the war was over.

However, peace was to be short-lived. The rebels quickly regrouped and organized around Santa Maria, intensifying the attacks: they took and set fire to the Calmon rail station; destroyed the village of São João (present-day Matos Costa), they attacked Curitibanos and threatened Porto União, causing the population to flee. There were rumours that they were on their way to invade the city of Ponta Grossa and some believed the rebels and their army would march all the way to Rio de Janeiro in order to oust the President. The rebels at the time already controlled 25,000 km2.

The federal government named General Setembrino de Carvalho the leader of the operation against the rebels in southern Brazil. So in September 1914 he led about 7,000 men with the mandate to suppress the rebellion and thus pacify the region at any cost. Setembrino sent out an announcement to the rebels in which he guaranteed the land would be returned to those who turned themselves in. He also promised, however, a harsh and hostile treatment to those who decided to continue the armed uprising against the government.

Change of strategy and the war's end

At this point in the war Deodato Manuel Ramos (also known as Adeodato) became a prominent figure, and he is considered by historians to be the last leader of the Contestadores. Adeodato moved the capital of the rebellious territory over to the Santa Maria valley, where he amassed about 5,000 men. As food and other shortages increased, he became more ruthless in dealing orders, including the execution of those willing to turn themselves in.

By then the rebels were totally enclosed, and internal strife further weakened them. On February 8, 1915, a column from the south led by Lt. Col. Estillac arrived in Santa Maria. That attack cost the Army 30 dead and 40 injured. New pushes and retreats took place in the next few days.

On March 28, 1915, Captain Tertuliano Potyguara led 710 men from the town of Reinchardt towards Santa Maria, losing 24 men in the process. After several strikes, the spiritual leader of the insurgents, Maria Rosa, was killed on the banks of the Caçador river. On the 3rd of April, Estillac's and Potyguara's troops advanced towards the final assault on Santa Maria, where a few of the starving rebels still lived.

On the 5th of April, after the major attack on Santa Maria, General Estillac wrote that "everything was destroyed, the estimated number of razed houses is 5000 (...) women that fought along the men were killed (...) the number of irregulars killed is over 600. The villages of Caçador and Santa Maria were annihilated. I cannot guarantee that all such bandits that festered in the Contestado may have disappeared, but the mission entrusted to the Army is now accomplished." The surviving rebels soon dispersed and moved to other towns and cities.

In December 1915, the last of the rebellious villages was destroyed by Gen. Setembrino's troops. Adeodato managed to escape and hide in the woods while being sought by the federal troops. The War of the Contestado was finally over with his arrest in August 1916.

Adeodato was sentenced to 30 years in prison. However, in 1923, less than seven years later, Adeodato was killed by the jail warden in an alleged escape attempt.

On October 12, 1916, the state governors Filipe Schmidt (Santa Catarina) and Afonso de Camargo (Paraná) signed an agreement and the town of Campos do Irani was renamed Concórdia.

Statistics of the war
Size of combat area: 20,000 km²
Population living in the combat area: about 40,000 inhabitants
Municipalities of Paraná (at the time): Rio Negro, Itaiópolis, Timbó, Três Barras, União da Vitória and Palmas
Municipalities of Santa Catarina (at the time): Lages, Curitibanos, Campos Novos, Canoinhas and Timbó Grande

See also
 Rebellions and revolutions in Brazil
 List of wars involving Brazil

References

Grandes Acontecimentos da História – Revista da Editora 3, nº 4 (setembro de 1973)
Diacon, Todd A. Millenarian Vision, Capitalist Reality: Brazil's Contestado Rebellion, 1912–1916 (Duke University Press 1991),

External links
Onwar
Article
UNC article with a brief mention
Brief mention on a Yale site.

First Brazilian Republic
Rebellions in Brazil
Conflicts in 1912
Conflicts in 1913
Conflicts in 1914
Conflicts in 1915
Conflicts in 1916
Contestado
Contestado War